Lucjen Jacenty Kudzia (born April 14, 1942 in Zawoja) is a Polish luger who competed during the early 1960s. He won a gold medal in the men's doubles event at the 1963 FIL World Luge Championships in Imst, Austria.

Kudzia competed in the 1964 Winter Olympics where he finished tied for fifth in the men's doubles event.

References
 Hickok sports information on World champions in luge and skeleton.
 Wallechinsky, David. (1984). "Luge - Men's singles". The Complete Book of the Olympics: 1896-1980. New York: Penguin Books. p. 576.

Lugers at the 1964 Winter Olympics
Lugers at the 1968 Winter Olympics
Lugers at the 1972 Winter Olympics
Polish male lugers
Living people
1942 births
Olympic lugers of Poland
People from Sucha County
Sportspeople from Lesser Poland Voivodeship